Purdue University Northwest (PNW) is a public university with two campuses in Northwest Indiana, one in Hammond and another in Westville. It is part of the Purdue University system and offers more than 70 undergraduate and graduate degree programs to approximately 9,400 students with more than 64,000 alumni.

History 
Purdue University Northwest was established in 2016 when two Purdue campuses — one in Hammond and the other in Westville, Indiana — merged. The formerly separate campuses, Purdue Calumet and Purdue North Central, each have an important history. During World War II, they offered technical courses as part of the national defense training program with the federal government. The campuses remained open when the war ended in 1945, offering for-credit college courses. Both campuses became degree-offering institutions in 1946.

Campuses

Hammond Campus 
{
  "type": "FeatureCollection",
  "features": [
    {
      "type": "Feature",
      "properties": {},
      "geometry": {
        "type": "Point",
        "coordinates": [
          -87.47438907623292,
          41.583285812396156
        ]
      }
    }
  ]
}The Hammond campus is a residential campus covering . The neighborhood campus includes 17 academic and recreational buildings, a fitness center, two apartment-style student housing facilities, the White Lodging Center for Hospitality and Tourism Management, and a Challenger Learning Center. Nearby PNW Hammond facilities include the Commercialization and Manufacturing Excellence Center, the Couple and Family Therapy Center, and Dowling Park, the home of Purdue Northwest baseball, softball, soccer and tennis. The $35 million Nils K. Nelson Bioscience Innovation Building opened in August 2020, housing state-of-the art instructional and research facilities for nursing, biological sciences and STEM education.

Buildings 
Gyte Science Building – In 1951, the Gyte Science Building originally called the Center Building, was the first building on the Hammond campus. GYTE was named after Millard Gyte, the first director of the Hammond Calumet facility.

E.D Anderson Building – In 1969, the E.D. Anderson Building was named after the Hammond Chamber of Commerce chairman that offered Purdue the site to build and develop the Calumet campus. ANDR is a three-story, brick structure that contains laboratories, workshops, and faculty offices.

Andrey A. Potter Laboratory Building – In the 1970, the Andrey A. Potter laboratory Building was built and named after a long-term Purdue West Lafayette dean of engineering and advocate of technical education. This structure is 30,000 square feet.

Student-Faculty Library Center – This 155,000 square foot structure is also known as the Student Union and Library building. This building was opened in 1971 and contains the library, a student center, bookstore, offices, and classrooms.

Lawshe Hall – In 1973, Lawshe Hall was completed to hold the campus’ administration and enrollment management center. LAWS is a 54,000 square foot structure.

Porter Hall – The School City of Hammond of the former Porter Elementary School purchased what is known as Porter Hall in 1980. At first, Porter Hall contained departments and offices. However, in 1991 renovations took placed and now accommodates communication and behavioral science programs.

Donald S. Powers Computer Education Building – In 1989, the Donald S. Powers Computer education Building was built and committed to technological education in Northwest Indiana.

Classroom Office Building – In 1996, Purdue Calumet celebrated its 50th anniversary. Since the campus was continually growing, there was a need for more classrooms and offices. In 1998, the Classroom Office Building was built.

Indianapolis Boulevard Counseling Center – Opened in 2018, the "IBCC" houses the Couple & Family Therapy Center and the Community Counseling Center. Both are training facilities that serve the greater Northwest Indiana region with affordable quality mental health services.

Westville campus 
{
  "type": "FeatureCollection",
  "features": [
    {
      "type": "Feature",
      "properties": {},
      "geometry": {
        "type": "Point",
        "coordinates": [
          -86.89301490783693,
          41.57641597789269
        ]
      }
    }
  ]
}

This location has three academic buildings, a spacious student services and activity center opened in 2015, and a veterinary emergency facility. The grounds of the Westville campus feature an extensive outdoor and indoor art collection, Shakespeare's Garden adjacent to a picturesque pond, tennis courts, an eighteen-hole disc golf course, a baseball diamond, and four outdoor basketball courts.

Buildings 
Schwarz Hall – In 1967, the first building on the current location was created. Schwarz Hall, previously named the Education building, is 90,000 square feet. In 1968, the east side of the building received an addition and a year later, it was ready for occupancy. In 1984, the building received its current name in honor of Robert F. Schwarz. Schwarz was the first dean of director.

Library-Student Faculty Building – In 1969, the need for a second building on campus was started. March 1975 completed the 100,000 square foot Library-Student-Faculty Building (LSF) was opened.

North Central Veterinary Emergency Center – May 2002, the North Central Veterinary Emergency Center (NCVEC) opened. This center is a 24-hour emergency veterinary clinic that tends to dogs, cats, and small animals within 50 miles.

The James B. Dworkin Student Services and Activities Complex – October 16, 2014 saw the opening of the James B. Dworkin Student Services and Activities Complex, named in honor of former Chancellor James B. Dworkin. The facility boasts a full-sized gymnasium, fitness facility with indoor running track and spacious conference center. In 2018, the complex hosted the Indiana U.S. Senate debate.

Gabis Arboretum at Purdue Northwest 
{
  "type": "FeatureCollection",
  "features": [
    {
      "type": "Feature",
      "properties": {},
      "geometry": {
        "type": "Point",
        "coordinates": [
          -87.151837348938,
          41.44632932907699
        ]
      }
    }
  ]
}Gabis Arboretum at Purdue Northwest is a 300-acre, oak preserve of formal gardens, woodlands, wetlands, prairies and hiking trails located near Valparaiso, Indiana. Open year-round, the Arboretum offers a wide variety of events and classes for all ages. Officially becoming part of Purdue University Northwest in 2018, Gabis Arboretum at Purdue Northwest provides an enriching, natural habitat for public, educational, conservation and recreational use. Located approximately 25 miles from the Indiana Dunes National Lakeshore and 60 miles southeast of Chicago in Valparaiso, Indiana, Gabis Arboretum offers beautiful vistas, quiet corners and hiking trails to escape into its diverse landscape.

Academics 
Purdue University Northwest offers undergraduate and graduate programs in more than 70 areas of study, plus a doctor of nursing practice degree. Purdue Northwest has been recognized among the best regional universities in the U.S. News & World Report Best Colleges rankings (2018).

Tuition 
Undergraduate tuition rates for full time students, as of 2019, is approximately $7,813 for in-state (Indiana resident) students and $17,654 for out-of-state students. Graduate tuition rates of at least 8 credit hours in 2018 are approximately $5,060 for in-state (Indiana resident) students and $10,798 for out-of-state students.

Incoming, out of state, freshman for the Fall of 2018 will see a decreased tuition rate due to the Reduced Out-of-State Advantage Rate (R.O.A.R.) Tuition Program. The R.O.A.R. program will give future Purdue Northwest freshman lower rates due to the Hammond campus’ location close to the Illinois border and the wide range of students who are enrolled from all around the country.

Approximately 63 percent of full-time undergraduates received some kind of need-based financial aid if applied.

As of the Fall of 2018, Purdue University Northwest offers banded tuition. Banded tuition is a single tuition rate within a range of credit hours. Undergrad students with 12 to 18 credit hours will pay the same tuition rate during the semester.

Student enrollment 
In the 2017–2018 academic year, the enrollment at PNW was 9,835 students. Of that:

 91% undergraduate and 9% graduate students
 65% full-time students and 35% part-time students
 56% female and 44% male
 60% Caucasian, 17% Hispanic/Latino, 9% African American, 7% International, 2% Asian, 5% other/not specified

Colleges, schools, and departments 
The university is organized into six colleges and three schools. They include:
College of Business (AACSB-Accredited)
White Lodging School of Hospitality & Tourism Management (ACPHA-Accredited)
Departments
Managerial Studies
 Quantitative Business Studies
College of Engineering and Sciences
School of Engineering (ABET-Accredited)
Departments
Electrical and Computer Engineering
Mechanical and Civil Engineering
Biological Sciences
Chemistry and Physics
Mathematics and Statistics
Computer Science
College of Humanities, Education and Social Sciences
School of Education & Counseling
Departments
Behavioral Sciences
Couple and Family Therapy
Communication and Creative Arts
English and World Languages
History, Philosophy, Politics and Economics
Psychology
College of Nursing
College of Technology
Departments
Computer Information Technology & Graphics
Construction Science & Organizational Leadership
Engineering Technology
Honors College

Athletics 
The Purdue–Northwest (PUNW or PU Northwest) athletic teams are called the Pride. The university is a member of the Division II level of the National Collegiate Athletic Association (NCAA), primarily competing in the Great Lakes Intercollegiate Athletic Conference (GLIAC) as a provisional member since the 2017–18 academic year (achieving D-II full member status in 2019–20). The Pride previously competed in the Chicagoland Collegiate Athletic Conference (CCAC) of the National Association of Intercollegiate Athletics (NAIA) only during the 2016–17 school year.

PU Northwest competes in 11 intercollegiate varsity sports and two non-varsity sports: Men's sports include baseball, basketball, cross country, golf, soccer and tennis; while women's sports include basketball, cross country, golf, soccer, softball, tennis and volleyball; and the non-varsity sports include men's ice hockey and men's volleyball.

History 
Purdue–Northwest was formed in 2016 by the combining of Purdue–Calumet (PUC; located in Hammond, Indiana and competing as the Peregrines) and Purdue–North Central (PUNC; located in Westville, Indiana and competing as the Panthers). Purdue–North Central joined the CCAC from before 2004–05 to 2015–16; while Purdue–Calumet joined the CCAC from 1973–74 to 1974–75, and from 1993–94 to 2015–16.

Move to NCAA Division II 
On September 27, 2016, Purdue–Northwest (PUNW) gained provisional acceptance into the NCAA Division II ranks as a provisional member of the GLIAC, starting the 2017–18 school year. As of the 2019–20 school year, the Pride became full time NCAA D-II members of the GLIAC.

Facilities 
Both campus locations offer a Fitness Center and Recreation Center. Memberships are free to every current, enrolled student. However, a fee is applied to other memberships, i.e. alumni, public, employee, etc. The Fitness Center also provides students with Intramural opportunities. With over 40 activities, any student, regardless of skill level and experience, can participate. Also, group exercise classes are available throughout the year for fitness center members.

Another major location is Dowling Park. Dowling Park is an outdoor facility that is home to PNW Pride Athletic Teams and a partnership with the City of Hammond. The complex started to be built on December 9, 2013, and was completed the Fall of 2015.

Other facilities include:

Labors Local 41 Field – Spring of 2015, the field was debuted. It is located in Dowling Park and is the official home of PNW baseball.

Fifth Third Bank Field – Spring of 2015, the field was debuted. It is, also, located in Dowling Park and is the official home of PNW softball.

John Friend Court – This basketball court is located at the Fitness and Recreational Center in Hammond. It is home to the Pride volleyball and women's and men's basketball teams.

Paul K. & Barbara Graegin Academic Excellence Center – The center is located in the Hammon Fitness and Recreational building and was funded by Barbara and the late Paul Graegin. The center offers a learning space for student-athletes that include computers, printers, and a place for presentations.

Pepsi Field – Spring of 2015, the field was completed. It was debuted in August 2015. Located in Dowling Park, the field is home of PNW's men and women's soccer teams.

H.D. Kesling Gymnasium – Completed in Spring of 2016 and located in the Dworkin Student Services and Activities Complex in Westville. The 107,000 square foot facility is home to a gymnasium, athletic offices, locker rooms, and a conference center.

Community Hospital Tennis Complex – Spring of 2016, the complex debuted and located in Dowling Park. It is home of the men and women's tennis team.

Community Hospital Training Room & Physical Therapy Center – In April 2015, the center opened up. PNW's partnership with Community Hospital offers physical therapy and other injury-related services for students, student-athletes, and public members.

Lalaeff & Fischer PNW Golf Training Center – April 27, 2018 was the opening of the training center. The 800-square foot golf center offers five types of synthetic surf, two television screens, and Ground Reaction Force (GRF) technology.

Notable alumni 
 Felicia Middlebrooks, radio news broadcaster (WBBM-AM)
 David Ober (2009), Bachelor of Science in computer graphics technology, former member of the Indiana House of Representatives from the 82nd district, current member of the Indiana Utility Regulatory Commission.
Dwayne Johnson, "The Rock"
Ares Marks
DJ Diesel
Foxy Brown

See also 
 Purdue University System

References

External links 
 
 Official athletics website

Universities and colleges formed by merger in the United States
Public universities and colleges in Indiana
Northwest
Northwest Indiana
Education in Lake County, Indiana
Education in LaPorte County, Indiana
Educational institutions established in 2016
2016 establishments in Indiana